Fabio Cherant (born November 25, 1994) is an American mixed martial artist who formerly competed in the Light Heavyweight division of the Ultimate Fighting Championship.

Background
Born in the Brooklyn borough of New York, Cherant had a nomadic childhood,in part because off his experience as a foster child, ending up in up in Wrentham for his high school years, spending those at King Philip Regional High School.

Starting training at the age of 19, when he was 21, he walked into a gym and made his MMA debut not long after. Cherant went to community college to study athletic training and criminal justice, stopping after a year to join the army reserves.

Mixed martial arts career

Early career
Making his MMA debut in 2018, Cherant won his first three bouts by submission in the first round; James Dysard via guillotine choke at CES MMA 48, followed Marquis Allen also by guillotine at CES MMA 50, and then Buck Pineau via rear-naked choke at CES MMA 51. In his final outing with CES MMA, he submitted Ron Marshall via rear-naked choke in the second round at CES MMA 53.

In the main event of Dana White's Contender Series 22, Cherant faced Aleksa Camur and went lose by the way of TKO in the second round via flying knee.

In his promotional debut appearance with Legacy Fighting Alliance at LFA 86, he faced Erick Murray and submitted him via anaconda choke in the first round. Making a return to CES, Cherant faced Yu Ji at CES 61, winning the bout via unanimous decision. Cherant faced Myron Dennis at LFA 99 for the LFA Light Heavyweight Championship. He won the bout and the title via unanimous decision.

Ultimate Fighting Championship
Cherant, as a replacement for William Knight, faced Alonzo Menifield on March 27, 2021, at UFC 260. At the weight-ins, Cherant weighted 206.5 pounds, half a pound over the non-title light heavyweight limit. The bout proceeded at a catchweight and he was fined 20% of his individual purse, which went to his opponent Menifield. Menifield won the fight via Von Flue choke in round one.

Cherant faced William Knight on August 21, 2021, at UFC on ESPN: Cannonier vs. Gastelum. He lost the fight via knockout in round one.

Cherant faced Carlos Ulberg on February 12, 2022, at UFC 271. He lost the bout via unanimous decision.

On March 1, 2022, it was announced that Cherant was released from the UFC.

Combat FC 
Cherant was scheduled to face Richardson Moreira on February 10, 2023, at Combat FC 3 but the bout was cancelled due to Moreira withdrawing from the bout.

Championships and accomplishments
Legacy Fighting Alliance
LFA Light Heavyweight Championship (One time)

Mixed martial arts record

|-
| Loss
| align=center|7–4
| Carlos Ulberg
| Decision (unanimous)
| UFC 271
| 
| align=center|3
| align=center|5:00
| Houston, Texas, United States
|
|-
| Loss
| align=center|7–3
| William Knight
| KO (punches)
| UFC on ESPN: Cannonier vs. Gastelum
| 
| align=center|1
| align=center|3:58
| Las Vegas, Nevada, United States
|
|-
| Loss
| align=center| 7–2
| Alonzo Menifield
|Submission (shoulder choke)
|UFC 260 
|
|align=center|1
|align=center|1:11
|Las Vegas, Nevada, United States
|
|-
| Win
| align=center| 7–1
| Myron Dennis
| Decision (unanimous)
| LFA 99
| 
| align=center| 5
| align=center| 5:00
| Park City, Kansas, United States
| 
|-
| Win
| align=center| 6–1
| Yu Ji
|Decision (unanimous)
|CES 61
|
|align=center| 3
|align=center| 5:00
|Warwick, Rhode Island, United States
|
|-
| Win
| align=center| 5–1
| Erick Murray Jr.
| Submission (anaconda choke)
| LFA 86
| 
| align=center| 1
| align=center| 0:57
| Sioux Falls, South Dakota, United States
|
|-
| Loss
| align=center| 4–1
| Aleksa Camur
| TKO (flying knee and punches)
| Dana White's Contender Series 22
| 
|align=center|2
|align=center|0:48
| Las Vegas, Nevada, United States
| 
|-
| Win
| align=center| 4–0
| Ron Marshall
| Submission (rear-naked choke)
|CES 53
|
| align=center|2
| align=center|2:41
|Lincoln, Rhode Island, United States
|
|-
| Win
| align=center| 3–0
| Buck Pineau
|Submission (rear-naked choke)
|CES 51
|
| align=center|1
| align=center|2:43
|Lincoln, Rhode Island, United States
|
|-
| Win
| align=center| 2–0
| Marquis Allen
| Submission (guillotine choke)
|CES 50
|
| align=center|1
| align=center|3:55
|Lincoln, Rhode Island, United States
|
|-
| Win
| align=center| 1–0
| James Dysard
| Submission (guillotine choke)
|CES 48
|
|align=center|1
|align=center|0:13
|Lincoln, Rhode Island, United States
|

See also 
 List of male mixed martial artists

References

External links 
  
 

1994 births
Living people
American male mixed martial artists
Light heavyweight mixed martial artists
Ultimate Fighting Championship male fighters